The 1938 Detroit Titans football team represented the University of Detroit in the 1938 college football season. In their 14th year under head coach Gus Dorais, the Titans compiled a 6–4 record and outscored opponents by a combined total of 148 to 42.

In addition to head coach Gus Dorais, the team's coaching staff included Lloyd Brazil (backfield coach), Bud Boeringer (line coach), and Michael H. "Dad" Butler (trainer). End Alex Chesney was the team captain.

Schedule

References

External links
 1938 University of Detroit football programs

Detroit
Detroit Titans football seasons
Detroit Titans football
Detroit Titans football